Sowmaeh-ye Pain or Sowmeeh-ye Pain may refer to:
 Sowmaeh-ye Pain, East Azerbaijan
 Sowmaeh-ye Pain, Razavi Khorasan